The Winnipeg Area Control Centre  is one of seven Area Control Centres in Canada operated by Nav Canada. 
Located at 777 Moray Street in Winnipeg, Manitoba, the centre controls all air traffic in Manitoba under 60,000 feet (including waters in Hudson Bay, as well as parts of Saskatchewan (from border with Alberta to Thompson) and Ontario east of Thunder Bay (including waters of Hudson Bay and James Bay). To the east is Toronto Area Control Centre and to the west is Edmonton Area Control Centre.

References

Air traffic control centers
Aviation in Manitoba